The 1958 Thomas Cup competition is an international team tournament for supremacy in men's badminton (its female counterpart is the Uber Cup). Beginning in 1948–49 it was held every three years until 1982 and has been held every two years thereafter. Nineteen teams contested for the Thomas Cup during the 1957-1958 season. As defending champion Malaya (now Malaysia) was exempt until the conclusive tie (team match) called the challenge round. The other eighteen teams were divided into four qualifying zones; Asia, Australasia, Europe, and Pan America; with the winners of each intra-zone competition advancing to inter-zone competition in Singapore to determine a challenger to Malaya. For a more detailed description of the Thomas Cup format see Wikipedia's  general article on the Thomas Cup.

Intra-zone summary
Winner of the previous two Asian zone competitions, India was decisively beaten 8–1 in the first round by a fast improving Thailand. Thailand went on to win the zone by shutting out Pakistan (9–0). In the Australasian zone, first time participant Indonesia served notice of international badminton's future by shutting out both New Zealand and Australia to advance to inter-zone play. Denmark again advanced easily through the European zone. The Danes now boasted newly crowned All-England singles champion Erland Kops along with Finn Kobbero, two exceptionally talented players, both in their early twenties. For the third straight time only United States and Canada contested in the Pan America zone. The all-Californian U.S. squad shut out a Canadian team whose best players in past meetings between the two were now either long in years or losing interest.

Inter-zone playoffs

Teams

Asia
 Thailand

Australasia
 Indonesia

Europe
 Denmark

Americas
 United States
 Malaya (exempt until challenge round)

The results of the inter-zone ties in Singapore gave ample evidence of both the growing popularity of the sport in the Far East and the advantage these nations enjoyed competing against "outsiders" in a tropical climate. Showing strength and balance in singles and doubles, Thailand sent the USA home with a 7–2 defeat. A curiously revealing match in this tie was the victory of Thailand's Subhabhan and Sudthivanich over the strong U.S. veterans Alston and Rogers, 18-14 in the third game after dropping the first game at zero. More stunning, and ominous for Malaya, was newcomer Indonesia's 6–3 victory over a highly rated Danish contingent. Erland Kops was beaten by both the internationally experienced Ferry Sonneville and by young sensation Tan Joe Hok. Even the powerful Danish doubles pairing of Finn Kobbero and Jorgen Hammergaard Hansen could earn only a split in two matches.

Indonesia went on to comfortably defeat Thailand in the inter-zone final 8–1. In another bad sign for Malaya, Thailand 's top two singles players, Charoen Wattanasin and Thanoo Khajadbhye, respected internationals who had dropped only one singles match between them in the campaign prior to playing Indonesia, were each decisively beaten by both Sonneville and Tan Joe Hok. Thailand won one doubles, though all four of these matches went to three games.

First round

Final round

Challenge round

The challenge round played in the middle of June brought Malaya's nine year Thomas Cup reign to an end. With Wong Peng Soon retired, Eddie Choong's game showing recent vulnerability, and some controversy over the selection of team members still percolating, Malayan confidence might have been low from the start. The three-time defending champions were unable to win any of the singles matches against Indonesia and eventually lost the tie 3–6. Choong was twice beaten routinely in straight games and was booed off the court by his countrymen. Malaya's other top singles player, Teh Kew San, nearly broke through against Sonneville but finally went down 16-18 in the third. At least one of Malaya's doubles wins appeared to be a gift after the outcome had been determined. Indonesia's Tan Joe Hok went through the entire Thomas Cup campaign undefeated in singles (Sonneville had dropped a match to Finn Kobbero). Tan would win the All-England singles title the following year and for a time would be regarded as the best player in the world. For a much longer time Indonesia would be the country to beat in international team badminton.

References
 tangkis.tripod.com
 Mike's Badminton Populorum 
 Our Badminton Greats
Herbert Scheele ed., The International Badminton Federation Handbook for 1967 (Canterbury, Kent, England: J. A. Jennings Ltd., 1967) 74–78.
Pat Davis, The Guinness Book of Badminton (Enfield, Middlesex, England: 1983) 121, 122.

Thomas Cup
Thomas & Uber Cup
T
T
Thom
1958 in Malayan sport
Badminton tournaments in Malaysia
Badminton tournaments in Singapore